In mathematics, a limit point, accumulation point, or cluster point of a set  in a topological space  is a point  that can be "approximated" by points of  in the sense that every neighbourhood of  with respect to the topology on  also contains a point of  other than  itself. A limit point of a set  does not itself have to be an element of  
There is also a closely related concept for sequences. A cluster point or accumulation point of a sequence  in a topological space  is a point  such that, for every neighbourhood  of  there are infinitely many natural numbers  such that  This definition of a cluster or accumulation point of a sequence generalizes to nets and filters. 

Importantly, although "limit point of a set" is synonymous with "cluster/accumulation point of a set", this is not true for sequences (nor nets or filters). That is, the term "limit point of a sequence" is  synonymous with "cluster/accumulation point of a sequence". 

Unlike for limit points, an adherent point of  may be  itself. A limit point can be characterized as an adherent point that is not an isolated point.

Limit points of a set should also not be confused with boundary points.

This concept profitably generalizes the notion of a limit and is the underpinning of concepts such as closed set and topological closure. Indeed, a set is closed if and only if it contains all of its limit points, and the topological closure operation can be thought of as an operation that enriches a set by uniting it with its limit points.

Definition

Accumulation points of a set

Let  be a subset of a topological space  

It does not make a difference if we restrict the condition to open neighbourhoods only. It is often convenient to use the "open neighbourhood" form of the definition to show that a point is a limit point and to use the "general neighbourhood" form of the definition to derive facts from a known limit point. 

If  is a  space (such as a metric space), then  is a limit point of  if and only if every neighbourhood of  contains infinitely many points of  In fact,  spaces are characterized by this property. 

If  is a Fréchet–Urysohn space (which all metric spaces and first-countable spaces are), then  is a limit point of  if and only if there is a sequence of points in  whose limit is  In fact, Fréchet–Urysohn spaces are characterized by this property.

Special types of accumulation point of a set

If every neighbourhood of  contains uncountably many points of  then  is a specific type of limit point called a condensation point of  

Accumulation points of sequences and nets

If  is a metric space or a first-countable space (or, more generally, a Fréchet–Urysohn space), then  is a cluster point of  if and only if  is a limit of some subsequence of  
The set of all cluster points of a sequence is sometimes called the limit set. 

Note that there is already the notion of limit of a sequence to mean a point  to which the sequence converges (that is, every neighborhood of  contains all but finitely many elements of the sequence). That is why we do not use the term  of a sequence as a synonym for accumulation point of the sequence.

The concept of a net generalizes the idea of a sequence. Clustering and limit points are also defined for filters.

Relation between accumulation point of a sequence and accumulation point of a set

 If there exists an element  that occurs infinitely many times in the sequence,  is an accumulation point of the sequence.

 If no element occurs infinitely many times in the sequence, for example if all the elements are distinct, any accumulation point of the sequence is an -accumulation point of the associated set 

Properties

Every limit of a non-constant sequence is an accumulation point of the sequence.
And by definition, every limit point is an adherent point.

The closure  of a set  is a disjoint union of its limit points  and isolated points :

A point  is a limit point of  if and only if it is in the closure of 

 

A corollary of this result gives us a characterisation of closed sets: A set  is closed if and only if it contains all of its limit points.
 

No isolated point is a limit point of any set.
 

A space  is discrete if and only if no subset of  has a limit point.
 

See also

Citations

References

  
  
  
 

 
Topology
General topology